Valeriy Viktorovych Daskalytsya (born 17 January 2002) is a Ukrainian professional footballer who plays as a goalkeeper for Chornomorets Odesa.

References

External links
 Personal statistics at UAF website (Ukr)
 Profile on Chornomorets Odesa official website
 

2002 births
Living people
Ukrainian Second League players
FC Chornomorets-2 Odesa players
FC Real Pharma Odesa players
Association football goalkeepers
Ukrainian footballers